The Australian Formula 500 Championship is an annual dirt track racing championship meeting held in Australia for Formula 500 cars. Formula 500's in Australia evolved from the old TQ's (Three Quarter Speedcar Midget) of the 1950s and 1960s.

The first Australian Championship was held on 28 December 1964 at the Point Pass Speedway and was won by South Australian driver Bob Lane.

A 40 and 50 year reunion for the event was held in November 2004 and 2014.

The current Australian Champion is Liam Williams who won the title at the Gunnedah Speedway in New South Wales.

The championship was known as the Australian TQ Championship from 1964-1976, after which it was renamed the Australian Formula 500 Championship.

The 2017 Australian Championship was held at the Murray Bridge Speedway in Murray Bridge, SA on 17 April and was won by Queensland's Liam Williams who won his 3rd national championship.

Winners since 1964

See also

Motorsport in Australia
List of Australian motor racing series

References

External links
Australian Formula 500 Championship honour roll

Australian Formula 500 Championship
Formula 500
Midget car racing